Spanish Fly is a 1998 French comedy film written and directed by Daphna Kastner and starring Daphna Kastner, Toni Cantó, Martin Donovan, Danny Huston, Marianne Sägebrecht and Antonio Castro. It was released in France on June 30, 1999, by Miramax Films.

Plot

Cast      
Daphna Kastner as Zoe
Toni Cantó as Antonio
Martin Donovan as Carl
Danny Huston as John
Marianne Sägebrecht as Rosa
Antonio Castro as Julio
Maria de Medeiros as Rossy
Vernon Dobtcheff as Carl's Friend 
Mary McDonnell as Zoe's Mother
Rossy de Palma as Interviewee

References

External links
 
 

1998 films
French comedy films
1998 comedy films
1990s English-language films
1990s French films